The margraviate or marquisate of Bodonitsa (also Vodonitsa or Boudonitza), today Mendenitsa, Phthiotis (180 km northwest of Athens), was a Frankish state in Greece following the conquests of the Fourth Crusade. It was originally granted as a margravial holding of Guy Pallavicini by Boniface, first king of Thessalonica, in 1204. Its original purpose was to guard the pass of Thermopylae.

The marquisate survived the fall of Thessalonica after the death of Boniface, but it was made subservient to the Principality of Achaea in 1248. The marquisate further survived the coming of the Catalan Company in 1311, but it fell to two Venetian families in quick succession: Cornaro (till 1335) and the Zorzi. Among the eighteen Catalan vassals of the area in 1380-1 the Margrave of Bodonitsa ranks third below Count Demitre and the Count of Salona. The Zorzi ruled the marquisate until the Ottoman Turks conquered it in 1414. Nicholas II continued to use the margravial title after that date, but the territory was never recovered.

Margraves

Pallavicini
Thomas inherited the Pallavicini margraviate after a dispute with Isabella's widower. He was a grandson of Rubino, brother of Guy. 
1204 – 1237 Guy
1237 – 1278 Ubertino
1278 – 1286 Isabella
1278 – 1286 (?) Antoine le Flamenc, husband (conjectured)
1286 – ca. 1300 Thomas
ca. 1300 – 1311 Albert
1311 – 1323 Maria dalle Carceri, wife
1312 – 1323 Andrea Cornaro, husband of above
1311 – 1358 Guglielma
1327 – 1334 Bartolommeo Zaccaria, husband

Zorzi
The first Zorzi was a husband of Guglielma.
1335 – 1345 Nicholas I
1345 – 1388 Francis
1388 – 1410 Jacob
1410 – 1411 Nicholas II
1411 – 1414 Nicholas III

References

Sources
 

Setton, Kenneth M. Catalan Domination of Athens 1311–1380. Revised edition. Variorum: London, 1975.

Bodonitsa
Principality of Achaea
States of Frankish and Latin Greece
History of Phthiotis
Medieval Central Greece
Former monarchies